Michael Mackenzie Lowe "Mackie" McDonald (born April 16, 1995) is an American professional tennis player. He reached a career-high singles ranking of world No. 48 on 1 August 2022, and No. 90 in doubles on 17 October 2022. He won the 2016 NCAA Division I Tennis Championships in both singles and doubles.

Juniors career
McDonald was a semifinalist in the boys' singles of the 2012 Australian Open.
In 2012, he reached a career high ranking in the ITF World Tour Junior Rankings of number 12 and won the 18s singles title at the 2012 Easter Bowl. While still a junior, he won the men's singles in the Ojai Tennis Tournament in 2013 and also qualified for the 2013 Cincinnati Masters at age 18 by defeating top 100 players Nicolas Mahut and Steve Johnson. However, he lost in the first round of the main draw to fellow qualifier David Goffin.

College career

2014
McDonald was listed as the No. 1 player coming into college according to the ITA. As a freshman at UCLA, he was named a Singles All-American and the Pac-12 Freshman of the Year. McDonald was also a quarterfinalist at the NCAA singles championship while compiling a 33–9 record during the season, including an 18–4 record in dual matches.

2015
At the 2015 NCAA Division I Men's Tennis Championship, he defeated top-ranked Axel Alvarez of Oklahoma during team competition. He played #1 singles and doubles for the UCLA Bruins for most of the season.

2016
During the 2016 season, he helped his Bruins to the quarterfinals of the Division I Tennis Team Championship. Then on Memorial Day, May 30, McDonald defeated the No. 1 ranked Mikael Torpegaard of Ohio State University for the singles championship at the Michael D. Case Tennis Center, in Tulsa, Oklahoma. He became the 12th UCLA Bruins player to win the singles title. McDonald also teamed with Martin Redlicki to play for the doubles championship. They defeated the team of Arthur Rinderknech and Jackson Withrow from Texas A&M to win the doubles individual championship. In doing so, McDonald became the first college player to win both the national singles and doubles titles since Matías Boeker of the University of Georgia in 2001.  After the NCAA tournament, on June 16, 2016, he announced that he would not return to UCLA for his senior year, but turn professional.

Professional career

2013-2015: ATP main draw debut
At age 18, McDonald qualified for the 2013 Western & Southern Open by defeating two top 100 players despite never previously having earned an ATP point. He became the first unranked teenager to qualify for an ATP World Tour Masters 1000 tournament since Sergio Casal at the 1995 Miami Masters. McDonald lost in the first round to David Goffin in straight sets. He was subsequently given a wildcard entry into the 2013 US Open qualifying.

McDonald qualified into the main draw of the 2014 Challenger in Winnetka, Illinois and defeated world no. 154 Sam Groth.

2016: Turned Pro, Grand Slam debut at the US Open

McDonald was awarded a wildcard into the main draw of the US Open, where he lost to Czech qualifier Jan Šátral in five sets in the first round. 
Beginning in late September and lasting through early October, McDonald had an impressive string of results in Challenger-level tournaments, winning his first ITF Pro Circuit title at USA F29 Irvine Futures, as well as reaching back-to-back semifinals in Tiburon and Stockton with impressive wins over three top-150 players.

2017: Oracle US Tennis Award
McDonald began the season winning the singles title at the F1 Los Angeles Pro Futures held at the University of Southern California, beating Carl Söderlund in the final by winning the last eleven games. In March at the BNP Paribas Open at Indian Wells, McDonald, along with former University of Virginia tennis player Danielle Collins, were selected to receive the Oracle US Tennis Awards, given to exceptional collegiate players transitioning to a professional. McDonald won the USA F12 Futures doubles event with Lloyd Glasspool, his fifth career Futures doubles title.

2018: Wimbledon fourth round, Top 100 debut
He participated in his first Australian Open in January where he defeated Elias Ymer in the first round after winning the qualifiers. In the next round, he was defeated by 3rd ranked Grigor Dimitrov in a 5 set thriller. Later, he won the Seoul Challenger against Jordan Thompson.

At Wimbledon, he reached his first Grand Slam third-round by winning his first-ever 5-set match over Nicolás Jarry in the round of 64. He then proceeded to defeat Guido Pella in straight sets to reach the second week of a grand slam for the first time in his career. He was then defeated in four sets by Milos Raonic in the round of 16.

2019: First top 10 win, Career-high ranking, Injury and out of Top 100
McDonald reached the final of the 2019 Dallas Challenger in February, where he lost in three sets to Mitchell Krueger, despite leading by a set and a break in the 2nd set.
He also participated in the 2019 Delray Beach Open in February, where he achieved his first top 10 win by defeating Juan Martín del Potro in the quarterfinals to reach his first ATP level semifinal, where he lost to Radu Albot.
His good form carried on into the ATP 500 Acapulco tournament, where he reached the quarterfinals, eventually losing to Cameron Norrie in two sets. These results helped propel him to a then career-high ranking of world No. 62 on March 4, 2019.

At the 2019 French Open, McDonald suffered a serious hamstring injury in his first round doubles match, forcing him to miss the rest of the 2019 season.

2020: Return to the tour, loss of form during COVID season
McDonald returned to the tour in January at the ASB Classic in Auckland. He lost in the final round of qualifying to Mikael Ymer. Using a protected ranking to enter the main draw at the Australian Open, he was defeated in the first round by 30th seed and world No. 32,Dan Evans, despite having a two sets to love lead.

After the early loss in Melbourne, McDonald competed at the Oracle Challenger Series – Newport Beach. Seeded ninth, he lost in the second round to compatriot Raymond Sarmiento. Seeded eighth at the RBC Championships of Dallas, he reached the quarterfinals where he lost to third seed Dominik Koepfer.

At the 2020 US Open, McDonald lost to 30th seed Casper Ruud from two sets up.

At the 2020 French Open, on his debut at this Major, McDonald earned his first victory at a Major since the 2019 Australian Open. Under the supervision of his new coach Jaime Pulgar García, he defeated Canadian qualifier Steven Diez in four sets before losing to defending (and eventual) champion Rafael Nadal in the second round in straight sets.

2021: Australian Open fourth round, First ATP final, return to Top 100
McDonald started his 2021 season at the Delray Beach Open. He lost in the first round to sixth seed, compatriot, and 2016 champion, Sam Querrey. At the Murray River Open, he beat 14th seed, Richard Gasquet, in the first round. He was defeated in the second round by Australian Alex Bolt. Ranked 192 at the Australian Open, he upset 22nd seed and world No. 25, Borna Ćorić, in the second round. He reached the 4th round of a Major for the second time where he was defeated by fourth seed and eventual finalist, Daniil Medvedev.

After the Australian Open, McDonald played at the Nur-Sultan Challenger. He won his 5th Challenger title by beating Jurij Rodionov in the final. At the Nur-Sultan Challenger II, he lost in the second round to eventual champion Tomáš Macháč. At the Open 13 Provence in Marseille, he was ousted from the tournament in the second round by third seed and world No. 21, Karen Khachanov. Getting past qualifying at the Miami Open, he fell in the second round to 18th seed, world No. 28, compatriot, and 2018 champion, John Isner, in three sets. Seeded third at the Orlando Open, he was defeated in the first round by compatriot Christian Harrison.

McDonald started his clay-court season at the BMW Open in Munich, Germany. Getting past qualifying, he knocked out sixth seed Dušan Lajović in the first round. He lost in the second round to fellow qualifier Ilya Ivashka. Seeded third at the Biella Challenger V, he was defeated in the second round by Leonardo Mayer. Seeded eighth at the Heilbronner Neckarcup, he reached the semifinals where he lost to Daniel Elahi Galán. In Geneva, he fell in the final round of qualifying to Ilya Ivashka. Getting past qualifying at the French Open, he lost in the second round to 22nd seed and world No. 23, Cristian Garín, in five sets, despite having two match points in the third-set tie-break.

Seeded fifth at the Nottingham Open, McDonald's first grass-court tournament of the season, he lost in the first round to Evgeny Donskoy. At the Nottingham Trophy, he reached the semifinals where he was defeated by qualifier Alex Bolt, who would end up winning the tournament. Getting past qualifying at Wimbledon, he lost in the first round to 25th seed and world No. 29, Karen Khachanov, who would end up reaching the quarterfinals.

Seeded eighth at the Los Cabos Open, McDonald was eliminated in the first round by qualifier and compatriot, Ernesto Escobedo.

McDonald began his US Open series at the Atlanta Open. He lost in the first round to Emil Ruusuvuori, who would end up reaching the semifinals. Next, he competed at the Citi Open in Washington, D.C. He upset defending champion, Nick Kyrgios, in the first round. He defeated compatriot, Denis Kudla, in the quarterfinals to reach his second Tour-level semifinal and first at the ATP 500 level. In the semifinals, he beat 2015 champion, Kei Nishikori, in three sets to reach his first ATP final. He lost in the final to 5th seed and world No. 24, Jannik Sinner, in three sets. As a result, he returned to the top 100 for the first time in 2 years, climbing more than 40 positions up in the rankings to world No. 64 on August 9, 2021. At the National Bank Open in Toronto, he fell in his first-round match to Benoît Paire. At the Western & Southern Open in Cincinnati, he was defeated in the second round by top seed and world No. 2, Daniil Medvedev. Ranked 61 at the US Open, he upset 27th seed and world No. 30, David Goffin, in the first round. He lost in the second round to 2014 finalist Kei Nishikori.

In October, McDonald played at the Indian Wells Masters. He lost in the second round to top seed and world No. 2, Daniil Medvedev. In Moscow, he was beaten in the second round by Gilles Simon. At the St. Petersburg Open, he lost in the second round to third seed and world No. 20, Roberto Bautista Agut. At the Paris Masters, he was defeated in the first round by Dušan Lajović. McDonald competed in his final tournament of the season at the Stockholm Open. He lost in the first round to Alejandro Davidovich Fokina in three sets.

McDonald ended the year ranked 55.

2022: Top 50 debut, Maiden ATP title & top 100 in doubles
McDonald started his 2022 season at the first edition of the Melbourne Summer Set 1. Seeded eighth, he lost in the second round to Botic van de Zandschulp. At the Adelaide International 2, he was defeated in the first round by eventual finalist, Arthur Rinderknech, in three sets. Ranked 55 at the Australian Open, he lost in the second round to 18th seed, world No. 15, and last year semifinalist, Aslan Karatsev, in four sets.

After the Australian Open, McDonald competed at the Open Sud de France. He was eliminated in the second round by top seed, world No. 3, and eventual finalist, Alexander Zverev. In Rotterdam, he beat eighth seed and world No. 21, Nikoloz Basilashvili, in the first round. He was beaten in the second round by Alex de Minaur in three sets. He made his top 50 debut on February 7, 2022 at world No. 49. At the Qatar ExxonMobil Open, he lost in the first round to sixth seed and world No. 27, Karen Khachanov. At the Dubai Championships, he upset seventh seed, world No. 22, and defending champion, Aslan Karatsev, in the first round. He was defeated in the quarterfinals by second seed, world No. 7, and eventual champion, Andrey Rublev. At the Indian Wells Masters, he was ousted from the tournament in the second round by 19th seed and rising star, Carlos Alcaraz. In Miami, he upset 26th seed and world No. 29, Grigor Dimitrov, in the second round. He lost in the third round to second seed, world No. 4, and 2018 finalist, Alexander Zverev.

McDonald started his clay-court season at the U.S. Men's Clay Court Championships in Houston. He lost in the first round to Nick Kyrgios. At the Barcelona Open, he was defeated in the second round by sixth seed and world No. 15, Diego Schwartzman. At the BMW Open in Munich, he fell in the first round to Ilya Ivashka. In Madrid, he lost in the final round of qualifying to Hugo Dellien. At the Italian Open, he was defeated in the first round of qualifying by João Sousa. Ranked 60 at the French Open, he upset 22nd seed and world No. 24, Nikoloz Basilashvili, in the second round. He lost in the third round to 11th seed and world No. 12, Jannik Sinner.

McDonald started his grass-court season at the Libéma Open in Rosmalen, 's-Hertogenbosch, Netherlands. He lost in the first round to Ilya Ivashka. At the Halle Open, he was defeated in the second round by fourth seed and world No. 9, Félix Auger-Aliassime. At the Mallorca Championships, he lost in the second round to Marcos Giron. Ranked 55 at Wimbledon, he was eliminated from the tournament in the second round by Richard Gasquet.

McDonald started his US Open series at the Atlanta Open. He lost in the second round to sixth seed, compatriot, and eventual finalist, Jenson Brooksby. Last year finalist at the Citi Open, he was defeated in the first round by Emil Ruusuvuori. At the National Bank Open in Montreal, he lost in the first round to Alex Molčan. In Cincinnati, he lost his second-round match to third seed and world No. 4, Carlos Alcaraz. Ranked 77 at the US Open, he lost in the first round to João Sousa in four sets. At the 2022 Rakuten Japan Open Tennis Championships, he won his maiden doubles title partnering Marcelo Melo after defeating third seeds Rafael Matos and David Vega Hernández. As a result he reached the top 100 at a new career-high doubles ranking of No. 96 on 10 October 2022.

McDonald ended the year ranked 63.

2023: Major third round with win over defending champion, world No. 2 Nadal
At the 2023 Australian Open, McDonald won his first round match in five sets against compatriot Brandon Nakashima. He then upset the defending champion and top seed Rafael Nadal in the second round in straight sets.

Personal life
McDonald is of Chinese, Scottish and English descent.

His girlfriend is Maria Mateaș, a Romanian American.

Performance timelines

Singles 
Current through the 2023 BNP Paribas Open.

Doubles

ATP career finals

Singles: 1 (1 runner-up)

Doubles: 1 (1 title)

ATP Challenger and ITF Futures finals

Singles: 8 (5–3)

Doubles: 9 (7–2)

Record against other players

Record against top 10 players
McDonald's record against those who have been ranked in the top 10, with those who are active in boldface. Only ATP Tour main draw matches are considered:

Top 10 wins
He has a  record against players who were, at the time the match was played, ranked in the top 10.

References

External links

 
 
 

1995 births
Living people
Sportspeople from Orlando, Florida
American male tennis players
American people of Chinese descent
American people of English descent
American people of Scottish descent
UCLA Bruins men's tennis players
Tennis people from California